Ole Andreassen (born 5 January 1966) is a Norwegian rower. He competed in the men's coxless pair event at the 1988 Summer Olympics.

References

1966 births
Living people
Norwegian male rowers
Olympic rowers of Norway
Rowers at the 1988 Summer Olympics
Sportspeople from Bergen